Jean Mongrédien, the son of , specializing in the seventeenth century, is a French musicologist.

Biography 
A specialist of music of France of the eighteenth and nineteenth centuries, and especially opera and religious music, since 2001 Mongrédien has been professor emeritus at Paris-Sorbonne University where he held the chair of history of music and was dean of the Department of Musicology.

Bibliography 
1986: La Musique en France : des Lumières au Romantisme (1789–1830), Paris, Flammarion, 370 p., 
2008: Le Théâtre-Italien de Paris 1801-1831 : Chronologie et documents, Marie-Hélène Coudroy-Saghai (collab.), Lyon, Symétrie, Venice, Palazzetto Bru Zane, series Perpetuum mobile, 8 volumes, 5384 p.,

References

External links 
 Jean Mongrédien on Encyclopédie Larousse
 Publications de Jean Mongrédien on CAIRN
 Jean Mongrédien on Symétrie
 La Musique en France des Lumières au Romantisme (compte rendu) on Persée  
 Jean Mongrédien's discography on Discogs
 Direction of thesis by Jean Mongrédien on Thèses.fr
 Bibliographie des travaux de Jean Mongrédien in D'un opéra l'autre: hommage à Jean Mongrédien

20th-century French musicologists
21st-century French musicologists
French male non-fiction writers
Living people
Year of birth missing (living people)
20th-century French male writers
21st-century French male writers
Academic staff of Paris-Sorbonne University